The 2022 TCR Europe Touring Car Series was the sixth season of TCR Europe Touring Car Series. The season began at the Algarve International Circuit in May and ended at the Circuit de Barcelona-Catalunya in October.

Calendar 
The calendar was announced with 7 rounds scheduled.

Teams and drivers 
Kumho is the new official tire supplier.

Results and standings

Season summary

Drivers' standings 

 Scoring system

† – Drivers did not finish the race, but were classified as they completed over 75% of the race distance.

Teams' standings

Notes

References

External links
 

TCR Europe
Europe